The Monolith of Silwan, also known as the Tomb of Pharaoh's Daughter, is a cuboid rock-cut tomb located in Silwan, Jerusalem dating from the period of the Kingdom of Judah; the latter name refers to a 19th-century hypothesis that the tomb was built by Solomon for his wife, the Pharaoh's daughter. The structure, a typical Israelite rock-cut tomb, was previously capped by a pyramid structure like the Tomb of Zechariah.  It is one of the more complete and distinctive First Temple-period structures. The pyramidal rock cap was cut into pieces and removed for quarry during the Roman era, leaving a flat roof. The tomb contains a single stone bench, indicating that it was designed for only one burial. Recent research indicates that the bench was the base of a sarcophagus hewn into the original building.

The Pharaoh's daughter tradition was first suggested by Louis Félicien de Saulcy, who noted that the bible claims that Solomon built a temple for his Egyptian wife; de Saulcy, excavating the site in the 19th century, suggested that this might be the same building. However, subsequent archaeological investigation has dated the site to the 9th-7th century BC, making the connection to Solomon impossible.

Two letters of a single-line Phoenician or Hebrew inscription survive on the building, the remainder of the inscription having been mutilated beyond recognition, by a hermit in the Byzantine era; Byzantine monks increased the height of the low entrance by removing rock which contained the inscription in order to ease access to the tomb, in which they resided. The tomb was cleaned following the 1967 Six-Day War.  Neglected since Ussishkin's survey, trash disposal has resulted in an unkempt, unattractive appearance (as of 2013).

See also
Rock-cut tombs in ancient Israel
Silwan necropolis
 Monolithic architecture

References

Buildings and structures completed in the 1st millennium BC
Ancient sites in Jerusalem
Buildings and structures in Jerusalem
Monoliths
Rock-cut tombs
Tombs in Israel